Willard Warren Marshall (February 8, 1921 – November 5, 2000) was a right fielder in Major League Baseball. From 1942 through 1955, Marshall played for the New York Giants (1942, 1946–1949), Boston Braves (1952), Cincinnati Reds (1952-1953) and Chicago White Sox (1954–1955). He batted left-handed and threw right-handed.

Career
In an 11-season career, Marshall posted a .274 batting average with 130 home runs and 604 RBI in 1246 games played. In 1947 he tied a NL record at the time by hitting three home runs in one game. In 1951 he became the second outfielder in the history of baseball to play an entire season without an error.

He was inducted into the Virginia Sports Hall of Fame in 1990.

Best season
: .291 BA, 36 HR, 107 RBI, 102 runs, .528 slugging %

Personal life
Marshall lived in Fort Lee, New Jersey and later in Rockleigh, New Jersey. He was buried at Fairview Cemetery (Fairview, New Jersey).

References

External links

Willard Marshall - Baseballbiography.com

National League All-Stars
Boston Braves players
Chicago White Sox players
Cincinnati Reds players
New York Giants (NL) players
Major League Baseball right fielders
Baseball players from Richmond, Virginia
1921 births
2000 deaths
Burials at Fairview Cemetery (Fairview, New Jersey)
People from Fort Lee, New Jersey
People from Rockleigh, New Jersey